Tazehabad-e Qaleh Juq (also Romanized as Tāzehābād Qal‘eh Jūq; also known as Tāzehābād, Tāzehābād-e Qal‘eh Joq, and Tāzeh Deh) is a village in Kalatrazan Rural District, Kalatrazan District, Sanandaj County, Kurdistan Province, Iran. At the 2006 census, its population was 134, in 27 families. The village is populated by Kurds.

References 

Towns and villages in Sanandaj County
Kurdish settlements in Kurdistan Province